The Unitarian Universalist Buddhist Fellowship (UUBF) is a "Related Organization" (formerly an "Independent Affiliate") to the Unitarian Universalist Association (UUA). Formed in the early 1990s, the UUBF exists to facilitate dialogue among UU Buddhists and other UUs interested in Buddhism and its practices. It is open to all Unitarian Universalists who are Buddhists of any tradition or who are interested in learning more about Buddhism. The UUBF publishes a newsletter, the UU Sangha, and posts back issues in an archive on its website. The website also has a list of UU Buddhist and meditation groups and contact information.  Instructions for joining the UUBF Listserv are there also.  Each year there is a UUBF booth in the exhibit hall  at UUA General Assembly. Every other year, in odd years, the UUBF holds a Convocation.

External links
UUBF's Homepage

Buddhist organizations based in the United States
Unitarian Universalist organizations
Religious organizations based in the United States
Religious organizations established in the 1990s
1990s establishments in the United States